Robert Scott (born 1917) is an American former Negro league first baseman who played in the 1940s.

Scott played for the Jacksonville Red Caps in 1941. In seven recorded games, he posted one hit in 21 plate appearances.

References

External links
 and Seamheads

1917 births
Possibly living people
Date of birth missing (living people)
Place of birth missing (living people)
Jacksonville Red Caps players
Baseball first basemen